Pope Caius (died 22 April 296), also called Gaius, was the bishop of Rome from 17 December 283 to his death in 296. Little information on Caius is available except that given by the Liber Pontificalis, which relies on a legendary account of the martyrdom of Susanna of Rome for its information. According to legend, Caius baptized the men and women who had been converted by Tiburtius (who is venerated with Susanna) and Castulus. His legend states that Caius took refuge in the catacombs of Rome and died a martyr.

Pontificate

Christian tradition makes Caius a native of the Dalmatian city of Salona, the son of a man also named Caius, and a member of a noble family related to the Emperor Diocletian. About 280, an early Christian house of worship was established on the site of Santa Susanna, which, like many of the earliest Christian meeting places, was in a house (domus ecclesiae). The domus belonged, according to the sixth-century acta, to brothers named Caius and Gabinus, prominent Christians. Caius may be this pope, or Caius the Presbyter. Gabinus is the name given to the father of Susanna. Thus, sources state that Caius was the uncle of Susanna.

As pope, Caius decreed that before someone could assume the position of bishop, he must first be porter, lector, exorcist, acolyte, subdeacon, deacon, and priest. He also divided the districts of Rome among the deacons. During his pontificate, anti-Christian measures increased, although new churches were built and cemeteries were expanded. St Caius may not have been martyred: the Diocletianic Persecution of Christians began in 303 AD, after Caius’ alleged death, and Diocletian was not immediately hostile to Christianity upon becoming emperor.

Legacy

Caius is mentioned in the fourth-century Depositio Episcoporum (therefore not as a martyr): X kl maii Caii in Callisti.

Caius' tomb, with the original epitaph, was discovered in the catacomb of Callixtus and in it the ring with which he used to seal his letters (see Arringhi, Roma subterr., 1. iv. c. xlviii. p. 426). In 1631, his alleged residence in Rome was turned into a church. However, it was demolished in 1880 to make room for the Ministry of War, on the Via XX Settembre, and his relics were transferred to the chapel of the Barberini family.

Saint Caius's feast day is celebrated on 22 April, as is that of Pope Soter. They are celebrated jointly in the Tridentine Calendar and in the successive versions of the General Roman Calendar until that of 1969, since when they are omitted. Both are mentioned under 22 April in the Roman Martyrology, the official list of recognized saints. The entry for Saint Caius is as follows: "At Rome, in the cemetery of Callistus on the Via Appia, the burial of Saint Caius, Pope, who, fleeing from the persecution of Diocletian, died as a confessor of the faith."

Saint Caius is portrayed in art wearing the papal tiara with Saint Nereus. He is venerated in Dalmatia and Venice. In Florence, the church of San Gaggio on the via Senese was dedicated to him; the term Gaggio is a corruption of the name Cajo. In 2003, plans were put into effect to turn it into residential council housing.

See also
List of Catholic saints
List of popes
Pope Saint Caius, patron saint archive

References

External links

Opera Omnia by Migne patrologia Latina

296 deaths
3rd-century archbishops
3rd-century Christian saints
3rd-century Romans
Papal saints
People from Roman Dalmatia
Popes
Year of birth unknown
Illyrian people
3rd-century popes
Legendary Romans